Sheikh Hamed bin Zayed Al Nahyan KBE (Arabic: حامد بن زايد آل نهيان) is an Emirati businessman and managing director of Abu Dhabi Investment Authority. He is a member of the Al Nahyan, ruling family of Abu Dhabi.

Early life and education
Sheikh Hamed is the son of late Emir (ruler) of Abu Dhabi, the founder and first president of UAE. His mother is Sheikha Mouza. He has four full-brothers, including late Sheikh Ahmed and Sheikh Saif. Current emir of Abu Dhabi, UAE President, Sheikh Mohamed Bin Zayed is his half-brother.  Hamed holds an economics degree, which he received from Emirates University, and a master's degree in petroleum economics, which he obtained from the University of Wales.

Career
Sheikh Hamed is the chairman of Abu Dhabi Crown Prince's Court and the member of Executive Council of Abu Dhabi. He is the deputy chairman of Khalifa University's board of trustees. Sheik Hamad is the chairman of the board of directors of Etihad Airways, the Abu Dhabi government-owned airlines.

On 14 April 2010, he replaced his deceased brother Sheikh Ahmed as the managing director of Abu Dhabi Investment Authority, one of the three largest sovereign wealth fund.

Influence
In 2012, he was included in the 50 Most Influential list of Bloomberg Markets magazine. He is the 12th in the list. In July 2013, Sheikh Hamed was ranked #1 on the Sovereign Wealth Fund Institute's Public Investor 100 ranking.

Honours

  Honorary Knight Commander of The Most Excellent Order of the British Empire (2013)

Ancestry

References

Living people
Year of birth missing (living people)
Hamed bin Zayed Al Nahyan
Place of birth missing (living people)
Emirati billionaires
Emirati politicians
Children of presidents of the United Arab Emirates
United Arab Emirates University alumni
Alumni of the University of Wales
Honorary Knights Commander of the Order of the British Empire
Sons of monarchs